Aliabad (also Romanized as ‘Alīābād) is a village in Bizaki Rural District, Golbajar District, Chenaran County, Razavi Khorasan Province, Iran. At the 2006 census, its population was 21, in 7 families.

See also 

 List of cities, towns and villages in Razavi Khorasan Province

References 

Populated places in Chenaran County